Zubir Amin (26 July 1939 – 23 December 2021) was an Indonesian politician. He served as Indonesia's ambassador to Madagascar from 1979 to 1982 and to Turkey from 1982 to 1984. Amin died on 23 December 2021, at the age of 82.

References

1939 births
2021 deaths
People from Pariaman
University of Indonesia alumni
Ambassadors of Indonesia to Turkey
Ambassadors of Indonesia to Madagascar